Amyipunga is a genus of beetles in the family Cerambycidae, containing the following species:

 Amyipunga armaticollis (Zajciw, 1964)
 Amyipunga barbarae Schmid, 2011
 Amyipunga canescens (Martins & Galileo, 2005)
 Amyipunga moritzii (Thomson, 1860)

References

Clytini